Ariston (from ) may refer to:

People 
Ancient Greece
 Ariston of Sparta (6th century BC), Eurypontid King of Sparta
 Ariston of Athens (died circa 424 BC), father of Plato
 Ariston of Byzantium, tyrant of the city of Byzantium
 Ariston of Paionia (4th century BC), Paionian prince, cavalry commander of Alexander the Great
 Ariston (king of Paionia) (3rd century BC), Paionian king
 Ariston (painter) (4th century BC), probably of Thebes
 Ariston (strategos), Aetolian military leader
 Ariston (hero), the protagonist of the 1967 historical novel Goat Song
 Ariston (actor), actor at the Susa weddings
Early Christians
 Ariston of Smyrna, Bishop in the late 1st century, Companion of John the Elder
 Ariston of Pella, 2nd century apologist quoted by Eusebius

Modern
 Jose Ariston Caslib (born 1968), current manager of the Philippine national football team

Other uses 
 Ariston, a brand of thermal comfort products manufactured by Ariston Thermo
 Ariston organette, metal disc with punched holes (late 1800s) — utilized on several music boxes 
 Ariston Thermo, a company in the thermal comfort sector
 Ariston Records, an Italian record label
 The former name for Indesit Company
 Ariston, a genus of spiders

See also
 Aristo (disambiguation)